The 2006-07 FFHG Division 1 season was contested by 16 teams, and saw the Diables Noirs de Tours win the championship. They were promoted to the Ligue Magnus as result. The Corsaires de Dunkerque, Jokers de Cergy-Pontoise and Jets de Viry-Châtillon were relegated to FFHG Division 2.

Regular season

Northern Group

Southern Group

Second round

Final round

Relegation

Relegation round

Relegation 
 Taureaux de Feu de Limoges - Albatros de Brest 7:4/7:6

External links
Season on hockeyarchives.info

FFHG Division 1 seasons
2006–07 in French ice hockey
Fra